The Sierra Nevada World Music Festival is an annual music festival held every June on the weekend of (or the weekend following) the summer solstice. It is currently held at the Mendocino County Fairgrounds in Boonville, California.

History
The festival began in 1994 in Marysville, California by organizer Warren Smith. Citing problems with crime in its initial location, organizers moved the festival to Angels Camp, California in 2001. After five years in Calaveras County, fairgrounds management insisted on hiring its own security and billing the festival. Organizers refused, causing the county to void the contract between the two parties. The festival settled in its current location (Boonville, CA), where it has operated since 2006.

Despite the festival's name, its primary focus is on reggae music, along with a secondary focus on world music acts. The festival boasts a "valley stage" (main stage), "village stage" (secondary stage), dancehall and drum circle, which can all feature music running concurrently. 

Along with its many other veteran acts, the SNWMF is notable for being the first to bring Junior Byles abroad, whereupon he performed a 45-minute set in for the festival in 1998.

There was no festival in 2020.

See also

List of reggae festivals
Reggae

References

External links 
 

Tourist attractions in Mendocino County, California
Music festivals established in 1994
Reggae festivals in the United States
Music festivals in California